Patricia Northrup is an American beauty pageant titleholder who was crowned Miss California in 1992.

She holds a bachelor of science in Aeronautical Engineering from California Polytechnic State University. She joined the California Air National Guard as a pilot and retired as a lieutenant colonel. While in the air national guard, she flew 75 combat missions during four deployments in Iraq and received three Air Medals. She is also a commercial pilot for American Airlines.

References

Year of birth missing (living people)
Living people
Recipients of the Air Medal
American beauty pageant winners
Aviators from California
California National Guard personnel
California Polytechnic State University alumni
Miss America 1993 delegates
Female officers of the United States Air Force
Women in the Iraq War
Commercial aviators

American women commercial aviators
National Guard (United States) officers